Pennsylvania held various elections on November 2, 2010. These include elections for a Senate seat, a gubernatorial race, and many state legislature races.

Federal

United States Senate 

Former Republican, now Democratic, Senator Arlen Specter was defeated in a primary election to Joe Sestak, who then faced Republican Pat Toomey.  In a narrow race, Pat Toomey was victorious over Sestak.

United States House

Twelfth District special election

A special election was held on May 18, 2010 to fill the seat left vacant by the death of Democratic U.S. Representative John Murtha. On March 8, 2010, the Pennsylvania Democratic Party's Executive Committee nominated Mark Critz, Murtha's former district director. On March 11, a convention of Republicans from the 12th district nominated businessman Tim Burns. The Democrats held the seat in the special election, with Critz defeating Burns.  Both would face each other again in November's general election, with Critz winning again.

General election

All 19 seats will face an election. Pennsylvania is expected to lose one congressional seat after the 2010 census.

State

Governor 

A new governor was elected(incumbent Governor Ed Rendell (D) is term limited), Tom Corbett, the Republican, won the general election with 55% of the vote against the Democrat, Dan Onorato, who carried 45% of the final vote.

State Senate

State House of Representatives

Judicial positions
Pennsylvania holds judicial elections in odd-numbered years.
Pennsylvania judicial elections, 2010 at Judgepedia

Ballot measures
At least one statewide ballot question has been proposed for the November 2 ballot:
1. Call for a Constitutional Convention
Pennsylvania 2010 ballot measures at Ballotpedia

See also
 Elections in Pennsylvania

References

External links
Voting and Elections at the Pennsylvania Department of State
Candidates for Pennsylvania State Offices at Project Vote Smart
Pennsylvania Polls at Pollster.com
Pennsylvania at Rasmussen Reports
Pennsylvania Congressional Races in 2010 campaign finance data from OpenSecrets
Pennsylvania 2010 campaign finance data from Follow the Money

 
Pennsylvania